Sheffield Township, Ohio may refer to:

Sheffield Township, Ashtabula County, Ohio
Sheffield Township, Lorain County, Ohio

Ohio township disambiguation pages